Neaman Salman Mansour al-Zaidi, known as Abu Suleiman al-Naser, was the military commander or "War Minister" of the militant group Islamic State of Iraq (ISI) during the Iraq War.

Little is known about Abu Suleiman. He is said to have been born into an ethnic Turkmen family. He reportedly to have trained at a foreign fighter camp in Rawa, Iraq, which was raided by US forces in 2003 and imprisoned at Camp Bucca. He succeeded Abu Ayyub al-Masri as Minister of War for the Islamic State of Iraq (ISI) in April 2010, after al-Masri and ISI leader Abu Omar al-Baghdadi were killed in an operation by US and Iraqi forces in Tikrit. Abu Suleiman's appointment was announced in a statement in which he used the nom de guerre Al-Nasser Lideen Allah Abu Suleiman, meaning "Defender of God’s Religion, Father of Suleiman". He is reported to have been a detainee at Camp Bucca prison, and served as the ISI's leader in Anbar Province under the nom de guerre Abu Ibrahim al-Ansari.

Iraqi security forces claimed to have killed Abu Suleiman in February 2011, in the city of Hīt, west of Baghdad. However, ISI denied that al-Naser was killed a month later. Despite this, ISI spokesman Abu Mohammed al-Adnani confirmed al-Naser's death in August 2011. ISI also released a statement confirming al-Naser's death in August 2011.

A report by Al Jazeera's Center for Studies, and an analysis of ISIL's leadership structure by a purported insider, also confirmed that Abu Suleiman had in fact been killed in 2011, and that following his death, the position of "War Minister" was replaced by a military council composed of former regime military officers under the leadership of Haji Bakr.

References

2011 deaths
Assassinated al-Qaeda members
Members of al-Qaeda in Iraq
Iraqi al-Qaeda members
Prisoners and detainees of the United States military
Iraqi prisoners and detainees
Leaders of Islamic terror groups